The Bust of a Chinese Gentleman is a bust of an anonymous Chinese gentleman donated to the National Museum of Singapore by William George Stirling in 1939.

History
The bust was sculpted by sculptor and then assistant protectorate of the Chinese in Singapore William George Stirling and donated to the Raffles Museum, now known as the National Museum of Singapore, in 1939. The bust did not depict any particular person, as it was Stirling's idea of a typical Chinese merchant. The bust was initially placed in the lawn in front of the museum, behind Raffle's Bust. In 1985, the bust was temporarily moved from its spot so that a time capsule could be placed in the spot. The bust was put into storage in 2003 while the museum underwent renovations, and was later placed in the Singapore History Gallery exhibit in 2013.

References

Bronze sculptures in Singapore